The 2020 Czech Republic motorcycle Grand Prix was the fourth round of the 2020 Grand Prix motorcycle racing season and the third round of the 2020 MotoGP World Championship. It was held at the Masaryk Circuit in Brno on 9 August 2020. Fabio Quartararo was the defending MotoGP race winner who aimed for his second consecutive Grand Prix win, having won the previous round.

In the MotoGP class, Brad Binder took his first victory in the premier class, the first for a South African rider, the first non-European rider to win since Australian Jack Miller in the 2016 Dutch TT, as well the first rookie to win a Grand Prix since Marc Márquez in 2013. With KTM's victory, this race marks the first time a non-Japanese and Italian constructor won a Grand Prix since German constructor König won the 1973 Yugoslavian Grand Prix. In addition, the KTM used the WP Suspension, which is marked the first non-Öhlins suspension to win a race since 2009 Valencian Grand Prix.

Background

Impact of the COVID-19 pandemic 
The opening rounds of the 2020 championship was heavily affected by the COVID-19 pandemic. Several Grands Prix were cancelled or postponed after the aborted opening round in Qatar, prompting the Fédération Internationale de Motocyclisme to draft a new calendar. However, the Czech Republic Grand Prix was not impacted by this change and kept its original date.

MotoGP Championship standings before the race 
After the second round at the Andalusian Grand Prix, Fabio Quartararo on 50 points, leads the championship by ten points over Maverick Viñales, with Andrea Dovizioso a further 14 points behind. In Teams' Championship, Petronas Yamaha SRT with 61 points, lead the championship from Monster Energy Yamaha, who have 56. Ducati Team sit 23 points behind the factory Yamaha in third, and are only 11 points ahead of fourth-placed LCR Honda, who have 22 points, while Pramac Racing sit 5th on 22 points.

MotoGP Entrants 
Stefan Bradl replaced Marc Márquez from the Czech Republic round onwards while he recovered from injuries sustained in his opening round crash.

MotoGP Qualifying

Q1 
In Q1 Álex Rins set the fastest lap of the session with the factory KTM of Brad Binder 0.6 secs behind. Miguel Oliveira was 0.98 sec behind Rins.

Q2 
Quartararo initially set a lap of 1.55.990 during his first run. A few minutes later, Johann Zarco recorded a 1.55.687 to secure pole position, and Quartararo achieved second place after crashing on his final run, 0.303 seconds back. Franco Morbidelli was third fastest, 0.311 behind pole position. The rest of the top 10 were:Aleix Espargaro, Maverick Viñales, Pol Espargaro, Brad Binder, Danilo Petrucci, Joan Mir, Valentino Rossi

This was Avintia Racing first pole position in MotoGP while being Zarco's 5th overall.

Race

MotoGP

 Francesco Bagnaia suffered a broken tibia in a crash during practice and withdrew from the event.

Moto2

 Simone Corsi suffered a broken toe in a crash during warm-up and was declared unfit to start the race.

Moto3

Championship standings after the race
Below are the standings for the top five riders, constructors, and teams after the round.

MotoGP

Riders' Championship standings

Constructors' Championship standings

Teams' Championship standings

Moto2

Riders' Championship standings

Constructors' Championship standings

Teams' Championship standings

Moto3

Riders' Championship standings

Constructors' Championship standings

Teams' Championship standings

Notes

References

External links

Czech
Motorcycle Grand Prix
Czech Republic motorcycle Grand Prix
Czech Republic motorcycle Grand Prix